Kid Norfolk (born William Ward, 10 July 1893 – 15 April 1968) was an American professional boxer who fought as a Light Heavyweight and Heavyweight from 1910 through 1926, holding wins over many notable boxers of his day including Joe Jeanette, Billy Miske, Jack Blackburn, Harry Greb, Tiger Flowers, Battling Siki, and Gunboat Smith. Norfolk was inducted into the International Boxing Hall of Fame in 2007.

Professional career
Born William Ward in Belmont, Virginia, Norfolk moved with his family to Panama as a youngster. He made his professional boxing debut on 29 November 1910 at the Albaugh Theater in Baltimore, Maryland, losing a six-rounder to Kid Jasper on points. He fought in Baltimore through 1913, then began campaigning in Panama in 1914. He took his name from having been born on Norfolk Street back in Belmont.

Panamanian heavyweight title 
Norfolk defeated Abraham Hollandersky decisively in January 1914 in Colon, Panama. Hollandersky had briefly held the Panamanian Heavyweight title from May 1913.  Norfolk first officially fought for the Heavyweight Title on 16 May 1915, taking on Jeff Clark at the Vista Allegre Bull Ring in Panama City. Clark (who weighed 173) gave Kid Norfolk (weighing in at 174) a beating, and won the 20-rounder on points. Their weights properly classed them as light heavies. In a rematch on 12 November 1916, Kid Nortolk took Clark's title away from him on points in 20 rounds. The Kid defended the title against one time world heavyweight contender Arthur Pelkey, a Canadian who had held the Dominion's heavyweight title and the White Heavyweight Championship during the latter days of Jack Johnson reign. The Kid K.O.-ed Pelkey in the 13th round.

Norfolk fought Sam Langford for the World Colored Heavyweight Championship on 17 December 1917 at Stockyards Stadium in Denver, Colorado, and was K.O.-ed in the second round of the scheduled 20-round bout. On 30 May 1921, The Kid fought Lee Anderson for the colored light heavyweight title in a scheduled 10-round bout in Phoenix, Arizona. Anderson won on a technical knock out when Norfolk returned to his corner in the ninth round, being unable to continue to fight. (They would meet another three times in non-title bouts between 1922 and 1924, and The Kid prevailed each time.) Of their first meeting in Phoenix for the "Colored World Championship", there was surprisingly little coverage, though the Arizona Republic wrote "two thousand fans watched the fights and every one of the 2000 is will to admit it was the best fight ever staged in the state".  Norfolk was unable to return to battle at the opening of the ninth round, claiming blindness, as his "left eye was completely closed."

Norfolk vs. Greb 
His next fight was against future world middleweight champ Harry Greb on 29 August 1921 in a 10-rounder at Forbes Field in Pittsburgh, Pennsylvania. The Kid, who at 178¾ lbs. outweighed Greb by 17 1/2 lbs., won four of the first five rounds and knocked Greb down in the third. Greb, however,  won all of the last five rounds. Greb won a newspaper decision, when two of the three newspaper covering the fight and the Associated Press gave him the win. During the fight, The Kid apparently landed a punch that  caused a detachment of the retina in Greb's eye that later led to Greb going blind in that eye.

World colored light heavyweight champion 
When Norfolk fought The Jamaica Kid on 20 December 1921 at Madison Square Garden in New York City, he had claimed the world colored light heavyweight title.  He beat the Jamaica Kid on points in an eight-round bout. In Atlanta on 30 January 1922, Norfolk faced Tiger Flowers, the boxer who would dethrone Greb and become the first African American world middleweight champ in 1926, K.O.-ing him in third round of a 10-rounder. He met reigning colored heavyweight champ Harry Wills on 2 March 1922 in Madison Square Garden in New York City for a 15-round non-title bout, losing to the great champion  via a K.O. in the second round. Wills outweighed him by 25¾ lbs.

He had a draw in a fight with Tiger Flowers on the Fourth of July 1922 in Memphis, Tennessee, and they fought again on 8 May 1923, in Springfield, Ohio for the colored Light Heavyweight Title. The Kid prevailed by K.O.-ing Tiger at 2:50 in the first round of their scheduled 12-round bout, in possibly his greatest and most historic victory. Though technically a world championship, there was surprisingly little coverage of the fight, with the Cincinnati Enquirer writing only one line, "Kid Norfolk stopped Tiger Flowers in one round the other night in Springfield, Ohio." Norfolk received far more coverage of non-championship bouts he had against well known white opponents.

Norfolk vs. Greb II 
Norfolk fought Greb one more time on 19 April 1924 in a scheduled 10-rounder in Boston. The Kid won when Greb was disqualified for fighting in the sixth round. The fight was wild and wooly, The Kid besting Greb through the first five rounds. In the second round, Greb had lowered his head and The Kid through the ropes and into the press section, which should have disqualified him, according to the Boston Globe. The last two rounds was a brutal, dirty fight, in which Norfolk intentionally punched Greb in the groin several times. When Greb retaliated, he was disqualified which angered the crowd and forced the referee to quit the ring. The result of the fight was a six-month suspension for both fighters. The boxing commission suspended both Greb and Norfolk six months for fighting after the bell.

Later career 
On 25 May 1925 at the Stadium Rink in Moose Jaw, Saskatchewan, Norfolk fought Canadian light heavyweight champ Jack Reddick in a 12-rounder, winning a decision on points. Though the fight was between two men who had held World Championships, newspaper coverage was minimal. Norfolk retired in 1926 with an official record of 70 wins (with 38 K.O.s) against 22 losses (being K.O.-ed seven times) and six draws along with 30 wins and two losses via newspaper decisions.  Despite being a top contender, he never challenged for a world title, the color bar having been drawn in the light heavy and heavyweight divisions in his era.

Norfolk died in 1968.

Honors
Norfolk was inducted into the International Boxing Hall of Fame in 2007.

Professional boxing record
All information in this section is derived from BoxRec, unless otherwise stated.

Official Record

All newspaper decisions are officially regarded as "no decision" bouts and are not counted in the win/loss/draw column.

Unofficial record

Record with the inclusion of newspaper decisions in the win/loss/draw column.

References

1893 births
1968 deaths
African-American boxers
Boxers from Virginia
Light-heavyweight boxers
World colored light heavyweight boxing champions
International Boxing Hall of Fame inductees
American male boxers
20th-century African-American sportspeople